Liberated Hands or Freed Hands is a 1939 German drama film directed by Hans Schweikart and starring Brigitte Horney, Olga Tschechowa and Ewald Balser. It was screened at the 8th Venice International Film Festival. Horney plays a sculptor who discovers her true vocation.

Cast
 Brigitte Horney as Dürthen, Schafhirtin
 Olga Tschechowa as Kerstin Thomas
 Ewald Balser as Professor Wolfram
 Carl Raddatz as Graf Joachim von Erken
 Paul Dahlke as Thomsen
 Eduard von Winterstein as Gutsbesitzer von Erken
 Franz Weber as Bergh, Diener
 Hedwig Wangel as Frau Steinmann
 Erna Sellmer as Pastorin
 Otto Brefin as Pastor
 Erika Helmke as Carla
 Luise Hohorst as Tante Mathilde
 Vera Hartegg as Josefa
 Albert Lippert as Van Daalen
 Alfred Maack as Postmeister
 Georg Schmieter as Harms
 Ernst Joachim Schlieper as Leuthold
 Herbert Knoll as Portier
 Haenschen Pfaff as Pfaff

References

Bibliography

External links 
 

1939 films
Films of Nazi Germany
German drama films
1939 drama films
1930s German-language films
Films directed by Hans Schweikart
Films about fictional painters
German black-and-white films
1930s German films